Charles de Grimaldi-Régusse (August 10, 1612 –  November 6, 1687) was a French aristocrat, landowner and politician.

Biography

Early life
Charles de Grimaldi-Régusse was born on August 10, 1612. His father was Pierre de Grimaldi and his mother, Suzanne de Laydet. His maternal grandfather was a parliamentary advisor to the Parliament of Aix-en-Provence. He was orphaned at the age of five and raised by his grandfather, Gaspard de Grimaldi, in La Ciotat. In 1630, his grandfather commissioned a building for him located at 18, rue Adolphe Abeille in La Ciotat (now demolished). He was educated in a Jesuit college in Avignon for eight years. He studied Law and received a Doctorate in Law on December 13, 1630.

Career
He served as parliamentary advisor to the Parliament of Aix-en-Provence in 1633, and as Président à mortier in 1643. In 1649, Régusse became a marquisate, and thus he became a significant landowner. He served as Commissioner to King Louis XIV of France at the Assembly in Aubagne in 1652.

However, he was exposed as a "rebel" to Louis XIV by Jean-Baptiste de Forbin-Maynier of Oppède (1648-1673), Président à mortier of the Parliament of Aix-en-Provence in 1673, and exiled in Issoudun for eleven months. Indeed, together with Antoine de Valbelle, he was opposed to taxes levied by the King, which contravened the taxes he and Antoine de Valbelle levied on merchants from Egypt (levying more taxes on those of Marseille than those of La Ciotat). In January 1660, King Louis XIV visited him at his private residence. However, he was exiled again from 1661 to 1664, this time in Abbeville.

Upon his return in 1664, he became President of the Parliament of Aix-en-Provence again. In 1667, he was appointed to the Conseil d'État privé, the precursor to the Conseil d'Etat, whereby he received a stipend of 2,000 French livres. Later, he purchased the baronetcy of Roumoules.

Personal life
He married Marguerite de Napolon of Corsica. They had seven children:
Françoise de Grimaldi-Régusse. She married Honoré Grimaldi.
Gaspard de Grimaldi-Régusse (c. 1640–1700). He married Charlotte de Castillon de Beynes, daughter of Pierre and Lucrèce de Forbin. They had a son:
Charles II de Grimaldi-Régusse (1675–1741). He married Lucrèce d'Estienne-Chaussegros, daughter of Louis and Marguerite de Revilliasc. They had a son:
Charles-Louis-Sextius de Grimaldi-Régusse (1701-1784), first cousin of Gaspard-Joseph Chaussegros de Léry.
Pierre (de Grimaldi-Régusse) de Moissac.
Sauveur de Grimaldi-Régusse. He became an abbey.
Charles de Grimaldi-Régusse. He became a Knight of Malta.
Jeanne de Grimaldi-Régusse. She became a religious sister.
Louise de Grimaldi-Régusse. She became a religious sister.

In 1635 and in 1642, he purchased two townhouses and converted them into the Hôtel Boyer de Fonscolombe, hôtel particulier located at 21 Rue Gaston de Saporta in Aix-en-Provence. Later, he also resided at the Hôtel de Grimaldi-Régusse, another hôtel particulier located at 26, rue de l'Opéra in Aix, built for him in 1680 and listed as a monument historique since 1973. He also resided in another hôtel particulier on the rue de la Tasse (now known as the rue Abeille) in La Ciotat, where he retired and wrote his memoir.

Death
He died on November 6, 1687 and was buried in La Ciotat.

Bibliography
Charles de Grimaldi marquis de Régusse, Mémoires de Charles de Grimaldi: marquis de Régusse, président au parlement d'Aix, Bordeaux: Presses Universitaires de Bordeaux, 2008, 158 pages.

References

1612 births
1687 deaths
People from Aix-en-Provence
Charles
Provencal nobility